The Saint Gallen Group, also called the Saint Gallen Mafia, was an informal group of high ranking like-minded liberal/reformist clerics in the Catholic Church, described by the Bishop of Saint Gallen, Ivo Fürer, who hosted the discussions, as a Freundeskreis ('circle of friends') – who met annually in or near St. Gallen, Switzerland, in January, to freely exchange ideas about issues in the church.

Name 
The group being informal, it had no official name. "Group of St. Gallen" is what some of its members called it in their agendas, and the name has become public after a full chapter devoted to it in the biography of Cardinal Danneels, published by Church historians Karim Schelkens and Jurgen Mettepenningen; "St. Gallen Group", "St. Gallen Mafia" and "St. Gallen Club" are alternatives.

At the presentation of this biography in September 2015, which was televised by VTM, Danneels said that the name "Group of St. Gallen" was "deftig" ('dignified', 'respectable'), "maar eigenlijk zeiden wij van onszelf en van die groep: de maffia" ('but actually we said of ourselves and of that group: the mafia'). This provoked laughter. Others later used that name too, not always jocularly.

History

Background 

The impetus for the discussions came from Bishop Ivo Fürer, who had been the secretary-general of the Council of the Bishops' Conferences of Europe from 1977 until 1995. When in 1993 the Vatican imposed a thorough reform of this council, Fürer was one of the members who felt that this meant the end of the main raison d'être of the council, viz. fostering collegiality among European bishops. In consultation with Cardinal Carlo Maria Martini, he decided to invite a group of cardinals, archbishops and bishops for frank, collegial discussions among themselves.

Attendance 
When the group met for the first time, in January 1996, Fürer invited Martini; Paul Verschuren, bishop of Helsinki; Jean Vilnet, archbishop of Lille; Johann Weber, bishop of Graz-Seckau; Walter Kasper, bishop of Rottenburg-Stuttgart (later Cardinal), and Karl Lehmann, bishop of Mainz (later Cardinal).

New members, all joining by invitation and all "open-minded" were:
 1999: Cardinal Godfried Danneels, archbishop of Mechelen-Brussels and Ad van Luyn, bishop of Rotterdam
 2001: Cormac Murphy-O'Connor, archbishop of Westminster (later Cardinal), and Joseph Doré, archbishop of Strasbourg
 2002: Alois Kothgasser, bishop of Innsbruck, later archbishop of Salzburg
 2003: Achille Silvestrini, a curia Cardinal, and Cardinal Lubomyr Husar, Major Archbishop of Lviv and Metropolitan of Galicia in the Ukrainian Greek Catholic Church
 2004: José Policarpo, Patriarch of Lisbon (in 2004).
 
Whilst in Rome before the 2005 papal conclave, the cardinals who were members of the Saint Gallen Group sent their host Ivo Fürer a card saying: "We are here together in the spirit of Saint Gallen", and before the conclave they came together for a talk over dinner. According to an anonymous cardinal's excerpts from whose diary were published by Brunelli, two of them, Lehmann and Danneels, were "the thinking core" of the reformisti during the conclave. These reformisti did not want to vote for Joseph Ratzinger, and tried to prevent his election by giving all their votes to Jorge Mario Bergoglio, who thus might achieve a blocking minority. They succeeded, but Bergoglio, "almost in tears", begged not to be elected. Ratzinger was elected Pope Benedict XVI.

The year after Ratzinger's election, what remained of the group met for the last time. The gathering was attended by just four members: Fürer, Kothgasser, Danneels and van Luyn.

Three of the remaining members, however, participated in the 2013 papal conclave: Walter Kasper, Godfried Danneels and Karl Lehmann. Cormac Murphy-O'Connor was too old to participate in the conclave, but he was present in Rome during the pre-conclave period. Unlike in 2005, there is no anonymous source to report from within the conclave on what role they played in the election of Pope Francis. According to Austen Ivereigh, the four worked in concert to advocate the election of Jorge Mario Bergoglio at the conclave, still hoping to elect a more modern leader for the Church. Also, in the first edition of his book, Ivereigh writes that "they first secured Bergoglio's assent". All four cardinals, however, denied this.

The director of the Holy See Press Office said the cardinals were "surprised and disappointed" at what was written about them and that they "expressly denied this description of events ...  with regard to the conduct of a campaign for [Bergoglio's] election". The strong push back from the cardinals was primarily due to the implication that they had broken the rules set forth in para. 82 of Universi Dominici gregis and therefore excommunicated latae sententiae. In the second edition of his book, Ivereigh bolstered the cardinal's defensive positioning by replacing the phrase with: "In keeping with conclave rules, they did not ask him if he would be willing to be a candidate.". But he stood by the rest of his reporting.

Secrecy 
The founders and members of the group all feeling that the Vatican impeded free discussion among bishops, the meetings were held in secrecy. Members observed "a simple rule: everything could be said, no notes were taken and discretion was observed."

The gatherings were revealed after the group had ceased to exist, in 2014 by Ivereigh, and described more extensively in 2015 in Danneels's authorized biography.

Issues and persons discussed
The issues discussed by the group included centralism in the Church, the role of the bishops' conferences, the role and position of priests, sexual morality, the nomination of bishops and collegiality. On all these issues, the Vatican had published documents which the participants found controversial.

All agreed that the prefect of the Congregation for the Doctrine of the Faith, Joseph Ratzinger, was a centralizing and conservative influence in Rome, especially as John Paul's health declined. They certainly did not want Ratzinger to succeed him.

Some members deny that they discussed other names, but Fürer contradicts them, and explicitly states that Jorge Mario Bergoglio's was mentioned in the group's discussion on the impending succession of John Paul II. He adds, however, that the members never committed themselves on any candidate. Bergoglio's name, however, could only have come up in Saint Gallen at the 2002 meeting. Bergoglio was only created a cardinal in February 2001, and Martini, who had met him in 1974, introduced him to some members, who knew him barely or not at all, at the extraordinary consistory of May 2001. Cardinal Bergoglio did not like the way the curia ran things, and his report on the 2001 bishops' synod earned him high praise all around, including from the Saint Gallen Group.

See also
 Catholic Church in Switzerland
 Universi Dominici gregis
 Council of the Bishops' Conferences of Europe (CCEE)
 Pact of the Catacombs
 Alta Vendita
 Squadrone Volante

References

Sources
 Austen Ivereigh The Great Reformer: Francis and the Making of a Radical Pope (With an updated and expanded epilogue) (New York: Picador, 2015) . In the notes: Ivereigh.
 Jürgen Mettepenningen & Karim Schelkens Godfried Danneels: Biografie (in Dutch); Karim Schelkens & Jürgen Mettepenningen Godfried Danneels: Biographie (in French) (Antwerpen: Uitgeverij Polis, 2015.) References (in the notes: M&S) are to the original Dutch version.
 Julia Meloni, The St. Gallen Mafia: Exposing the Secret Reformist Group Within the Church, Tan Books, 2021.

2005 papal conclave
2013 papal conclave
Pope Francis
Pope Benedict XVI
Catholic Church in Switzerland
Society of Jesus